Charles Russell Train (October 18, 1817 – July 28, 1885) was a U.S. Representative from Massachusetts.

Biography
Born in Framingham, Massachusetts, Train attended the common schools, Framingham Academy, and was graduated from Brown University, Providence, Rhode Island, in 1837.
He studied law at Harvard University.
He was admitted to the bar and commenced practice in Framingham, Massachusetts, in 1841.
He served as member of the Massachusetts House of Representatives in 1847 and 1848.
He served as district attorney 1848-1854.
He declined the appointment of Associate Justice of the Supreme Court of the United States in 1852.
He served as delegate to the Massachusetts Constitutional Convention of 1853.
He served as delegate to the Republican National Convention in 1856 and 1864.
He served as member of the Massachusetts Governor's Council in 1857 and 1858.

Train was elected as Republican to the Thirty-sixth and Thirty-seventh Congresses (March 4, 1859 – March 3, 1863).
He served as chairman of the Committee on Public Buildings and Grounds (Thirty-sixth and Thirty-seventh Congresses).
He was not a candidate for renomination in 1862.
He was one of the managers appointed by the House of Representatives in 1862 to conduct the impeachment proceedings against West H. Humphreys, United States judge for the several districts of Tennessee.
During the Civil War served in the Union Army as a volunteer aide-de-camp to General George B. McClellan.
He moved to Boston, Massachusetts.
He again served in the Massachusetts House of Representatives 1868-1871.
Massachusetts Attorney General 1872-1879.
He resumed the practice of law.
He died while on a visit in Conway, New Hampshire, July 28, 1885.
He was interred in Edgell Grove Cemetery, Framingham, Massachusetts.

See also

 1868 Massachusetts legislature

References
 Retrieved on 2008-02-15

1817 births
1885 deaths
Harvard Law School alumni
Republican Party members of the Massachusetts House of Representatives
Massachusetts Attorneys General
County district attorneys in Massachusetts
Massachusetts lawyers
Union Army officers
Brown University alumni
Politicians from Boston
People of Massachusetts in the American Civil War
Republican Party members of the United States House of Representatives from Massachusetts
Lawyers from Boston
19th-century American politicians
19th-century American lawyers